Unsettled Land (lit. The Dreamers; also known as Once We Were Dreamers) is a 1987 Israeli drama directed by Uri Barbash.

The film premiered in the International Competition at the Tokyo International Film Festival and was selected to be shown at the Israel Film Festival in New York.  It also won awards for Best Cinematography (Amnon Salomon) and Best Art Direction (Eitan Levy) at the Israel Film Center.

Plot
In 1919, a group of idealistic Jewish pioneers from Europe, including Austrian doctor Anda (Kelly McGillis) and her Russian violinist lover Marcus (John Shea) who was a former yeshiva student and became a fervent Labor Zionist after the murder of his family in a pogrom, arrive in Palestine and attempt to establish a kibbutz in the Galilee. Their dream ends up shattered as they attempt to cope with the hardships of the land, sexual and ideological tensions within the group, and hostile confrontations with their Arab neighbours. Finally, the film dramatizes their disappointment as they must come to terms with the gaps between their utopian vision and reality.

As Miri Talmon has noted, the film "makes a clear intergenerational connection between the ‘pioneers’ and the shattering of the dream, which is the experience that the audience and the individual filmgoer faced at the end of the eighties.”

Cast
Kelly McGillis as Anda
John Shea as Marcus
Christine Boisson as Sima
Arnon Zadok as Amnon
Robert Pollock as Yulek
Sinai Peter as Daniel
Neta Moran as Temma
Amos Lavi as Muhammed
Boris Rimmer as Avrum
Alan Bergreen as Natan
Martha Arden as Rosa
Rachel Amran as Maha
Avi Gouetta as Salim Assistant 2
Yossi Ashdot as Shepard

Critical reception
Despite its rather large budget and Hollywood stars, the film did poorly at the box office and garnered poor reviews.

References

External links
 
 

1987 films
Israeli drama films
Hebrew-language films
Films about the kibbutz
Films set in 1919
Films set in Palestine (region)
Films set in Mandatory Palestine